Bastiaan ("Bas") Jacob Paauwe (4 October 1911 – 27 February 1989) was a Dutch footballer who was active as a midfielder. Paauwe played his whole career at Feijenoord and won 31 caps for the Netherlands, scoring one goal.

Honours
 1929-30 : KNVB Cup winner with Feijenoord
 1934-35 : KNVB Cup winner with Feijenoord
 1935-36 : Eredivisie winner with Feijenoord
 1937-38 : Eredivisie winner with Feijenoord
 1939-40 : Eredivisie winner with Feijenoord

References

External links

 Profile

1911 births
1989 deaths
Dutch footballers
Eredivisie players
Feyenoord players
Association football midfielders
Netherlands international footballers
1934 FIFA World Cup players
1938 FIFA World Cup players
Footballers from Rotterdam
Dutch football managers
VVV-Venlo managers
FC Wageningen managers
SC Heerenveen managers